Staplehurst Monarchs Football Club is a football club based in Staplehurst, England.

History
Staplehurst were founded in 1893, later joining the Kent County League. The club changed their name to their current guise in 2005. In 2011, the club were promoted to the Kent County League Premier Division, later winning the league in 2019. In 2021, the club was admitted into the Southern Counties East League Division One. Staplehurst Monarchs entered the FA Vase for the first time in 2021–22.

Ground
The club currently play at the Jubilee Sports Ground in Staplehurst.

References

Association football clubs established in 1893
1893 establishments in England
Football clubs in England
Football clubs in Kent
Kent County League
Southern Counties East Football League